The 1993 CONCACAF Champions' Cup was the 29th edition of the annual international club football competition held in the CONCACAF region (North America, Central America and the Caribbean), the CONCACAF Champions' Cup. It determined that year's club champion of association football in the CONCACAF region and was played from 23 January till 5 December 1993.

The teams were split in two zones (North/Central and Caribbean), being the best 3 from the North/Central and the best team from Caribbean to qualify to the final tournament. All qualifying matches in the tournament were played under the home/away match system while the final tournament was played in a group system in Guatemala City.

That final stage composed of four teams which played each other in a single round-robin tournament. Costa Rican team Saprissa crowned CONCACAF champion for their first time, after finishing 1st in the final with a goal difference of +8.

North and Central American Zone

Preliminary round

1 Hercules withdrew before 1st leg, and both legs awarded 2–0 to Juventus.

First round

Second round

León, Municipal and Saprissa advance to the CONCACAF Final Tournament.

Caribbean Zone

First round

1 Zion Inter, Racing Gonaïves, Tempête and Hawks all withdrew before 1st leg, and their rivals were awarded 2-0 wins in each of both matches.

Second round

Semifinals

Final 

SV Robinhood advance to the CONCACAF Final Tournament.

|name_LEÓ=Club León
|name_MUN=C.S.D. Municipal
|name_ROB=S.V. Robinhood
|name_SAP=Deportivo Saprissa

Final tournament

Matches

Champion

References

CONCACAF Champions' Cup
c